Totally Wicked Stadium is a rugby league stadium in the Peasley Cross area of St. Helens. Known as Langtree Park until 2017, it has a capacity of over 18,000 and is the home ground of St Helens R.F.C. The stadium was granted full planning permission on 20 May 2008. On 11 July 2008 the go-ahead was given without the need for a public enquiry and construction started in 2010.

The first rugby league match to be played at the stadium was between St. Helens and Widnes on Friday 20 January 2012. St. Helens won the opening game by 42–24 and they moved in ready for the 2012 Super League season. Liverpool F.C. U18s also play their home games at the stadium.

Plans and construction 
The proposed plans came in three parts. The proposed parts were:

1. The transformation of the derelict former United Glass site to create a new 18,000-capacity stadium for St. Helens as well as a  Tesco Extra next to the rugby ground. The stadium itself was to be a seating and standing arena with an oval shaped roof extending out from the south stand.

2. The redevelopment of the existing town centre Tesco store in Chalon Way into alternative high quality retail use, enhancing the retail available in St Helens town centre.

3. The development of the existing St. Helens site at Knowsley Road to create high quality residential accommodation, regenerating the local area.

The club stressed that if one of the three parts fell through, the whole project would have been in jeopardy. However councillors in St Helens approved the new Saints' stadium. Members of the Planning Committee endorsed the triple planning application granting permission subject to terms and conditions and a health and safety risk assessment

Demolition of the former UGB Glass plant began in late January 2009, with construction due to begin after the clearance of the  site had been completed. In July 2010, the building contractor Barr Construction Ltd was selected to build the new stadium. Construction commenced on 23 August 2010, with the Tesco store completed in October 2011 and the stadium in November 2011.

Layout 
The stadium has two terraced stands and two seated, the pitch is grass although the touchline has some astro-turf. The match day hospitality consists of the sale of the Saints Gold beer which is served inside the ground at a number of kiosks and in the Redvee cafe bar. The stadium has a large Saints badge on the outside with the recently restored town motto: Ex Terra Lucem underneath. A bronze statue of former club captain Keiron Cunningham stands over the main entrance.

The stadium can be accessed via a number of routes, including the recently erected Steve Prescott bridge in memory of Steve Prescott MBE, a former St. Helens and Hull F.C. player renowned for his fund raising contributions to charity.

North Stand
Capacity – 4,718 (seated)
The North Stand runs parallel to the South Stand along the side of the pitch. The stand is completely seated and has SAINTS V spelt out in the seats and is occupied by home fans.

South Stand
Capacity – 5,233 (seated)
The South Stand is the main stand of the ground and holds the club's hospitality boxes, tunnel and player changing rooms, ticket office, bar and club shop as well as the TV gantry.

East Stand
Capacity – 3,899 (standing)
The East Stand is located behind the goal posts and is completely terraced. The stand also houses the score board in the North East corner and the stand is used by away fans.

West Stand
Capacity – 3,796 (118 seats)
The West Stand is mostly terracing but also has 118 seated in the corner of the stand.

Usage

Rugby League
St Helens played their first league game at the ground in 2012, when they won against Salford. Their record victory at the stadium was 76–0 against Oldham in the Challenge Cup. The highest recorded attendance for a match so far was 17,980 against Wigan on 6 April, with an average attendance of 14,212 for the 2012 season.

The venue hosted the first of two Rugby league International Origin Match in 2012 between England and the Exiles.
Langtree Park held a group match in the 2013 Rugby League World Cup between Australia and Fiji. The stadium hosted three group games in the 2021 Rugby League World Cup.

The stadium played host to the Challenge Cup Semi Final between Warrington and Leeds on 9 August 2014.

Association Football 
All of Liverpool U19s NextGen matches in the 2012–13 season were held at Langtree Park, as were many Under 21s matches.

Sponsorship
It was announced on 15 November 2011 that primary developers, the Langtree Group, had gained the naming rights and that the stadium would be named Langtree Park. In 2016 the club signed a five-year deal with Totally Wicked, a vaping and e-cigarettes company, for the naming rights to the stadium, effective in early 2017.

References

External links 

 Official Club website
 Official Stadium website
 Development company webpage for Stadium Park
 Totally Wicked Official Website

Rugby league stadiums in England
Rugby League World Cup stadiums
St Helens R.F.C.
Sports venues in Merseyside
Buildings and structures in St Helens, Merseyside